Blame It On My Youth is an album by the Holly Cole Trio. Originally released in Canada in 1991 on Alert Records, it was subsequently released internationally in 1992 on the Manhattan imprint of Capitol Records.

Track listing

 "Trust in Me" (Robert B. Sherman, Richard M. Sherman) – 3:23
 "I'm Gonna Laugh You Right out of My Life" (Cy Coleman, Joseph McCarthy) – 2:37
 "If I Were a Bell" (Frank Loesser) – 2:17
 "Smile" (Charlie Chaplin, Geoffrey Parsons, John Turner) – 4:13
 "Purple Avenue" (Tom Waits) – 3:57
 "Calling You" (Bob Telson) – 4:38
 "God Will" (Lyle Lovett) – 3:11
 "On the Street Where You Live" (Alan Jay Lerner, Frederick Loewe) – 5:33
 "Honeysuckle Rose" (Andy Razaf, Fats Waller) – 2:20
 "I'll Be Seeing You" (Sammy Fain, Irving Kahal) – 5:54

Personnel

 Holly Cole – vocals
 Aaron Davis – piano
 David Piltch – bass
 Johnny Frigo – violin in "Honeysuckle Rose" & "If I Were a Bell"
 Robert W. Stevenson – bass clarinet in "On the Street Where You Live"

References

Holly Cole albums
1992 albums
Capitol Records albums